Forest John "Dizzy" Royal (August 15, 1914 – March 3, 1991) was an American Negro league pitcher in the 1930s.

A native of Chicago, Illinois, Royal played for the Indianapolis Athletics in 1937. He died in Chicago in 1991 at age 76.

References

External links
 and Seamheads

1914 births
1991 deaths
Indianapolis Athletics players
Baseball pitchers
Baseball players from Chicago
20th-century African-American sportspeople